The Celtic Cup is a rugby union cup competition featuring development regional and provincial teams from Ireland and Wales that began in 2018.

Formation

Following the withdrawal of English clubs from, and the subsequent demise of, the British and Irish Cup in 2018, the Irish Rugby Football Union and the Welsh Rugby Union agreed to create a new development competition, the Celtic Cup, for the emerging professional players from the four Irish provinces and four Welsh regions in 2018. The name had been used previously between 2003 and 2005 for a short lived single elimination knockout competition between teams in the then Celtic League.

The new tournament, which features development squads from Pro14 teams Connacht, Leinster, Munster, Ulster, Cardiff Blues, the Dragons, the Ospreys and the Scarlets, aims to provide a learning environment for players, coaches and referees by recreating the week-to-week challenges presented by senior professional rugby.

Format and history

Summary

2018

The first season of the Celtic Cup ran over seven consecutive weeks in 2018. The eight teams were divided into two conferences of four Welsh regions and four Irish provinces. Each Irish province played each of the Welsh regions and against two Irish provinces. Similarly, the Welsh regions played each of the Irish provinces and two of their Welsh counterparts. The top-ranked province from the Irish conference played the top-ranked region from the Welsh conference in the final .

Leinster A won the first edition of the new competition, beating Scarlets A 15-8 in the final at Parc y Scarlets.

2019

The second season saw an immediate format change, with the competition defaulting to a single table, and a single round-robin format, each team playing all other teams once. Once more, the competition was run over eight consecutive weeks in 2019. The two highest ranked teams, regardless of nation, proceeded to a final, hosted by the team that finished first in the table.

Leinster A retained their title, defeating fellow Irish province Ulster A 31-10 in the final at Energia Park.

Teams

  Ireland
 Connacht
 Leinster
 Munster
 Ulster

  Wales
 Cardiff Blues
 Dragons
 Ospreys
 Scarlets

References

 
Rugby union competitions in Ireland
Rugby union competitions in Wales
2018 establishments in Ireland
2018 establishments in Wales
Recurring sporting events established in 2018